The badminton men's doubles tournament at the 2010 Asian Games in Guangzhou took place from 16 November to 20 November at Tianhe Gymnasium.

Schedule
All times are China Standard Time (UTC+08:00)

Results
Legend
WO — Won by walkover

Final

Top half

Bottom half

References

External links 
 Results
 Bracket

Badminton at the 2010 Asian Games